María Trinidad Sánchez, Mother Founder (16 May 1794, Santo Domingo- 27 February 1846, Santo Domingo) was a Dominican freedom fighter and a heroine of the Dominican War of Independence. She participated on the rebel side as a courier. Together with Concepción Bona, Isabel Sosa and María de Jesús Pina, she took part in designing the Dominican flag. She was executed after having refused to betray her collaborators in exchange for her life. The María Trinidad Sánchez Province is named after her. Her remains rest in the National Pantheon of the Dominican Republic in Santo Domingo.

See also 

 Francisco del Rosario Sánchez, nephew
 Socorro Sánchez del Rosario, niece

References 

 Biografía y valoración en Red Poder Comunitario.

1794 births
1846 deaths
Flag designers
19th-century Dominican Republic people
19th-century rebels
Women in 19th-century warfare
People of the Dominican War of Independence
Women in the Dominican War of Independence
19th-century executions by Spain
Dominican Republic revolutionaries 
Dominican Republic independence activists
Afro-Dominican (Dominican Republic)